Guardia Dushanbe is a football club based in Dushanbe, the capital of Tajikistan.

History

Domestic history

References

Football clubs in Tajikistan
Football clubs in Dushanbe